Logchina Gewog (Dzongkha: ལོག་ཅི་ན་,Loggchina Gewog) is a gewog (village block) of Chukha District, Bhutan. The gewog has an area of 70.4 square kilometres and contains 12 villages. Logchina Gewog is part of Phuentsholing Dungkhag (sub-district), along with Dala, Sampheling, Dungna, Metakha and Phuentsholing Gewogs.

References 

Gewogs of Bhutan
Chukha District